Première is the first album by the New Brunswick Youth Orchestra (NBYO), released in November 2003 (see 2003 in music). All tracks were conducted by Principal Conductor Dr. James Mark.

Origin of name 
Première means "a first performance", and this album is the first by the NBYO.

Track listing 

2003 debut albums
New Brunswick Youth Orchestra albums